Sir Maurice Alberic Twisleton-Wykeham-Fiennes (1 March 1907 – 14 September 1994) was an English industrialist.

Fiennes was the son of Alberic Arthur Twisleton-Wykeham-Fiennes, and his wife, Gertrude Theodosia Pomeroy (née Colley), and great-grandson of Frederick Benjamin Twisleton-Wykeham-Fiennes, 16th Baron Saye and Sele. He was educated at the independent Repton School in the village of Repton in Derbyshire and at Armstrong College in Newcastle-upon-Tyne.

He was the managing director of Davy & United Engineering and chairman of Davy-Ashmore in Sheffield, and achieved success as a producer of high quality British steel. He was made a knight in the 1965 New Year Honours in recognition of his contributions to British engineering.

He married Sylvia Joan Finlay, with whom he had five children including photographer Mark Fiennes. He was the grandfather of actors Ralph Fiennes and Joseph Fiennes, and great-grandfather to model and actor Hero Fiennes Tiffin.

Notes

References

1907 births
1994 deaths
Maurice
Businesspeople in steel
Knights Bachelor
20th-century English businesspeople